Qasimabad is a town of Sahiwal District in the Punjab province of Pakistan. It is located at 30°30'0N 72°36'0E with an altitude of 156 metres (515 feet). Neighbouring settlements include Shujabad and Asghari.

References

Populated places in Sahiwal District